Kyle Fuller is an American football cornerback.

Kyle Fuller may also refer to:

Kyle Fuller (basketball), a Peruvian-American basketball player
Kyle Fuller (offensive lineman), an American football offensive lineman